Celene Ibrahim is an Islamic scholar. She is currently serving as a faculty member in the Department of Religious Studies and Philosophy at Groton School.

Biography
Ibrahim graduated from Princeton University with a BA in Near Eastern Studies, and was the first person to receive a Master of Divinity from Harvard University with a concentration in Islamic studies and Muslim leadership. She received her PhD for her work on Arabic and Islamic Civilizations, as well as a Master of Arts in Women and Gender Studies and Near Eastern and Judaic Studies from Brandeis University. She worked as a chaplain at Tufts University and was a scholar-in-residence in Islamic studies on the faculties of Andover Newton Theological School and Hebrew College.

Works
As author 
 Islam and Monotheism
 Women and Gender in the Qur'an
 As editor 
 One Nation, Indivisible: Seeking Liberty and Justice from the Pulpit to the Streets

References

Islamic studies scholars
Female Islamic religious leaders
Princeton University alumni
Harvard Divinity School alumni
Brandeis University alumni
Women scholars of Islam
21st-century Muslim scholars of Islam
Muslim scholars of Islamic studies
Year of birth missing (living people)
Living people